Krasneno is a rural locality (a selo) in Anadyrsky District of Chukotka Autonomous Okrug, Russia, located southwest of Anadyr, the administrative center of the autonomous okrug. As of 2016, its population was estimated to be 63.

Etymology
Krasneno's name literally means "red", although old maps show the village as "Krasnyano", meaning rich or abundant in the Russian Old Believers' dialect, in reference to fish stocks nearby. Krasneno gets its name from Lake Krasnoye, on the shores of which it is located; the lake itself is named so due to being surrounded by red and brown rocks on its shoreline.

History
It was founded in 1957. Historically, the area was known for abundant fishing, with Beluga whale and Ringed seal entering the lake from Anadyrsky Liman. Due to its proximity to the former Anadyrsk ostrog (fortress), the area was famous for trade fairs between Russians and Chukchi.

Around 2010, a number of houses were bought from Alaska as part of a refurbishment project.

Administrative and municipal status
Within the framework of administrative divisions, Krasneno is subordinated to Anadyrsky District. Within the framework of municipal divisions, Krasneno is considered to be inter-settlement territory within Anadyrsky Municipal District. Until 2010, Krasneno was municipally incorporated as Krasneno Rural Settlement within Anadyrsky Municipal District.

Economy
Krasneno has a general store, a primary school, a post office, and a cultural center. Local infrastructure has been assisted by the delivery from Alaska of several cottages around 2010. The economy is centered on traditional hunting and fishing, as the majority of the population is indigenous.

Transportation
Krasneno is not connected to the outside world by any road network.

Demographics
The population as of January 2014 was estimated to be 70; down from the 2003 estimate of 118, as reported in the 2005 environmental impact report produced for the Kupol Gold Project, or of 95, as reported by the Red Cross. The population consists mainly of indigenous Chukchi, who make up around 90% of the population, though there is also a small number of Russians living there as well.

Climate
Krasneno has a Continental Subarctic or Boreal (taiga) climates (Dfc).

See also
List of inhabited localities in Anadyrsky District

References

Notes

Sources
 

 

Bema Gold Corporation. Environmental Impact Assessment, Kupol Gold Project, Far East Russia, June 2005.

M. Strogoff, P.-C. Brochet, and D. Auzias. Petit Futé: Chukotka. "Avant-Garde" Publishing House, 2006.

Rural localities in Chukotka Autonomous Okrug